Rombley is a surname. Notable people with the surname include:

Edsilia Rombley (born 1978), Dutch singer and television presenter
Danny Rombley (born 1979), Dutch baseball player